John Cox Dillman Engleheart (1784–1862) was an English miniature painter.

Life
Engleheart was the nephew of the miniature painter George Engleheart. He entered his uncle's studio at the age of fourteen. He first exhibited at the Royal Academy in 1801, and went on to show a total  of 157 works. He was a man of substantial means, and in his time a very popular painter, but his health broke down when he was 44 years old, and he had to relinquish the pursuit of his profession. He lived at Tunbridge Wells for some years and died there in 1862.

References

1784 births
1862 deaths
18th-century English painters
English male painters
19th-century English painters
Portrait miniaturists
People from Royal Tunbridge Wells
19th-century English male artists
18th-century English male artists